Mondriel DeCarlos A. Fulcher (born October 15, 1976) is a former American football tight end who played three seasons with the Oakland Raiders of the National Football League. He was drafted by the Oakland Raiders in the seventh round of the 2000 NFL Draft. He played college football at the University of Miami and attended Field Kindley High School in Coffeyville, Kansas.

References

External links
Just Sports Stats

Living people
1976 births
Players of American football from Kansas
American football tight ends
African-American players of American football
Miami Hurricanes football players
Oakland Raiders players
People from Coffeyville, Kansas
21st-century African-American sportspeople
20th-century African-American sportspeople